Rye House Stadium is a former greyhound racing and speedway venue in Rye Road, Hoddesdon, Hertfordshire. It is situated adjacent to the River Lea Navigation.

Origins
The name Rye House originates from a collection of medieval buildings on an area known as the Isle of Rye due to the fact that the land was directly next door to the River Lea/Lee and in particular the Lee Navigation. When the stadium was constructed in 1935 it was put next door to Rye House on a spare plot which is where the name for the stadium came from. Rye House had been the family home for the Parr family that included Catherine in the 16th century and later a workhouse and tourist attraction in the 19th century. All that remains today of the original Rye House is the gatehouse found to the north of the stadium.

The stadium (or circuit as it was then) was first used on 27 May 1934 when it hosted speedway meetings. The stadium was accessed from Rye Road either in an easterly or westerly direction with Hoddesdon to the west and a large sewage works to the east.

The stadium today

The stadium has hosted greyhound racing, speedway and stock car racing. The stadium was taken over by Warren Scott in 2016 and underwent an upgrade. However, Scott was subject to a bankruptcy order in 2018. Next to the stadium is Rye House Kart Circuit which was built on a former site of the speedway track.

In 2019, the stadium was taken over by the Rye House Group, who subsequently submitted plans (in 2021) to the East Hertfordshire District Council for redevelopment of the site. The speedway track was also demolished.

Speedway

The stadium was the home of the Rye House Rockets but the team folded in 2018. The Rye House Cobras were also based here and competed in the National League until 2012.

Greyhound racing
In 1937, the speedway rider Dicky Case took over the sixty acre estate of Rye House and introduced a training school operating under the name of the Hackney Motor Club. The school operated until 1938 when Rye House entered the Sunday Dirt-track League.

The stadium was described as being able to hold 4,000 spectators and it was not until 1960 that Gerry Bailey and Jack Carter took over the lease and immediately began to upgrade the facilities moving the greyhound track to the outside of the speedway track to form a 440-yard circumference. Racing was held on Wednesday and Saturday evenings and an 'Inside Sumner' system and photo finish was installed.

During 1974 six independent tracks (unaffiliated to a governing body) took advantage of the new National Greyhound Racing Club (NGRC) rule allowing smaller venues to join them in what was called the permit scheme. Hackney Wick Stadium introduced the Lead sponsored by William Hill in 1975 and switched the 1,000 Guineas to a longer distance, consequently Rye House introduced the Sovereign Stakes for sprinters to compensate for the loss of the 1,000 Guineas. The competition attracted some of the sports leading sprinters.

Gin And Jass trained by Dave Drinkwater claimed the Crayford Vase and broke four track records in addition to winning the Pall Mall Stakes in 1976. Salina and Regal Girl (both George Lang) won two consecutive 'Key' competition victories before Dutch Jet became Peterborough Derby champion in 1983 for Jean Talmage.

The management found it difficult to continue racing under NGRC rules due to increased costs and in 1985 reverted to independent racing. However, in March 1988 Eddie Lesley took over the lease and brought the stadium back under NGRC rules once again. The track dimensions were changed to a 389 circumference and distances of 255, 465, 595 and 655m. Gerry Bailey was installed as the Racing Manager who then took over the lease again with Carter in 1990 and they in turn made Ray Spalding the Racing Manager. Spalding was later to become General Manager with Frank Baldwin brought in as Racing Manager.

In 1995 Theo Mentzis won the St Leger with Kens Dilemma and one year later Night Trooper finished runner up in the English Greyhound Derby. Night Trooper a black dog trained by Nikki Adams then went undefeated through the Pall Mall in 1997 and claimed the Reading Masters.

John 'Ginger' McGee had an attachment at the track in 1998 following his return from a 1994 NGRC ban and in 1999 the Sovereign Stakes was revived under new Racing Manager David Quinn. which was won by Night Trooper.

In the summer of 2000 the site was sold to Silversport owned by speedway promoter Len Silver and Hazel Naylor but after a short venture with the greyhound racing they ended the greyhounds in 2004. The greyhounds remained closed until 2005 before re-opening under former Racing Manager Sue Picton and then closing for good on 15 November 2006.

Competitions

Sovereign Stakes

1986, 1994-1998, 2001-2003 (not held)

Track records

References

Sports venues in Hertfordshire
Defunct greyhound racing venues in the United Kingdom
Defunct speedway venues in England
Hoddesdon